Berosus interstitialis is a species of hydrophilid beetles from the Bahamas, Haiti, Guadeloupe, the U.S. Virgin Islands, Puerto Rico and Cuba.

References

Hydrophilinae
Beetles described in 1924